Daniel Wong may refer to:

 Daniel Wong (soccer)
 Daniel Chi-Kwong Wong, Canadian murderer
 Daniel Wong Kwok-tung (born 1949), Hong Kong lawyer and politician